Taylor Jay Harwood-Bellis (born 30 January 2002) is an English professional footballer who plays as a centre-back for Burnley on loan from Manchester City. Harwood-Bellis has represented his country at U16, U17, U19, U20 and U21 level.

Club career

Manchester City

2018–2020 
From Stockport, Harwood-Bellis started playing with Manchester City from the age of six. He came through the same Stockport Metro Junior League that produced City team-mate Phil Foden. Harwood-Bellis formed a centre-back partnership with Eric Garcia as part of the City youth side that made it to the FA Youth Cup final in 2019.

On 24 September 2019, Harwood-Bellis made his professional debut when he was named in the starting line up for Manchester City's EFL Cup tie away against Preston North End. He made his second appearance for City and his debut in European competitions with his 82nd-minute introduction during a 4–1 victory over Dinamo Zagreb in the Champions League group stage on 11 December 2019. 

On 4 January 2020, Harwood-Bellis scored his first goal for Manchester City in a 4–1 win against Port Vale in the FA Cup. On 7 December 2020, Harwood-Bellis signed a four-year contract extension, keeping him at the club until 2024.

Blackburn Rovers and Anderlecht loans 
On 1 February 2021, Harwood-Bellis joined Championship side Blackburn Rovers on loan for the remainder of the 2020–21 season. Five days later, he made his debut for Blackburn as a substitute for Ryan Nyambe in a 0–1 away league defeat by Queens Park Rangers.

On 27 June, Harwood-Bellis joined Belgian First Division A side Anderlecht on a season-long loan deal.

Stoke City (loan) 
On 11 January 2022, Harwood-Bellis joined Championship side Stoke City on loan until the end of the 2021–22 season. Harwood-Bellis was a regular in the side for the remainder of the season, playing 24 times as Stoke finished in 14th position.

Burnley (loan)
On 1 July 2022, Harwood-Bellis joined Championship side Burnley on loan for the 2022–23 season. He scored his first goal for the club on 13 September in a 1–1 draw against Preston North End.

International career
Harwood-Bellis captained the England under-17 team at the 2019 UEFA European Under-17 Championship and scored in a group stage defeat against the Netherlands.

Harwood-Bellis made his U20 debut during a 2–0 victory over Wales at St. George's Park on 13 October 2020.

On 27 August 2021, Harwood-Bellis received his first call up for the England U21s.  On 7 September 2021, he made his England U21 debut during the 2-0 2023 UEFA European Under-21 Championship qualification win over Kosovo U21s at Stadium MK. On 25 March 2022, Harwood-Bellis captained the U21s for the first time during a 4-1 win over Armenia at Bournemouth.

Career statistics

References

External links

2002 births
Living people
English footballers
Footballers from Stockport
English Football League players
Belgian Pro League players
Manchester City F.C. players
Blackburn Rovers F.C. players
R.S.C. Anderlecht players
Stoke City F.C. players
Burnley F.C. players
Association football defenders
England youth international footballers
England under-21 international footballers
English expatriate footballers
Expatriate footballers in Belgium